Next to Normal (stylized in all lowercase) is a 2008 American rock musical with book and lyrics by Brian Yorkey and music by Tom Kitt. The story centers on a mother who struggles with worsening bipolar disorder and the effects that managing her illness has on her family. The musical addresses grief, depression, suicide, drug abuse, ethics in modern psychiatry, and the underbelly of suburban life.

Before its Off-Broadway debut, Next to Normal received several workshop performances and won the Outer Critics Circle Award for Outstanding New Score and received Drama Desk Awards nominations for Outstanding Actress (Alice Ripley) and Outstanding Score. After its Off-Broadway run, the show played from November 2008 to January 2009 at the Arena Stage while the theater was in its temporary venue in Virginia.

The musical opened on Broadway in April 2009. It was nominated for eleven Tony Awards that year and won three: Best Original Score, Best Orchestration, and Best Performance by a Leading Actress in a Musical for Alice Ripley. It also won the 2010 Pulitzer Prize for Drama, becoming the eighth musical in history to receive the honor. In awarding the prize to Kitt and Yorkey, the Pulitzer Board called the show "a powerful rock musical that grapples with mental illness in a suburban family and expands the scope of subject matter for musicals."

The first US tour launched in November 2010, with Alice Ripley reprising her Broadway role; the tour concluded in July 2011. The Broadway production closed on January 16, 2011, after 20 previews and 734 regular performances. There have been numerous international productions.

Synopsis

Act I
Diana Goodman, a suburban mother with bipolar disorder, stays up late awaiting the return of her son Gabe, who has broken curfew. Also awake is Diana's daughter Natalie, an overachieving high school student who is stressfully studying for an upcoming test. Diana encourages her daughter to take a break and rest. Soon after, Gabe returns home, and Diana's husband, Dan, awakes to help the family prepare for the day ("Just Another Day"). Diana prepares a meal for her family, but Dan and Natalie stop her when they realize the sandwiches she is making cover every kitchen surface. As Dan helps the disoriented Diana, Natalie and Gabe leave for school.

Natalie releases some pent-up anger and frustration as she practices for an upcoming piano recital in the school's music room ("Everything Else"), where she meets Henry, a classmate who has been admiring Natalie from afar. Meanwhile, Diana repeatedly visits her psychiatrist's office, where she is prescribed a variety of medications that all prove to cause debilitating physical side effects; Dan waits through her appointments in the car while he questions his own sanity ("Who's Crazy?/ My Psychopharmacologist and I"). When Diana is given a medication that numbs and rids her of all feelings, the doctor pronounces her stable and sends her on her way.

After witnessing a romantic moment between Natalie and Henry ("Perfect For You"), Diana mourns the loss of her old life, longing for the days she lived in both pain and joy, as opposed to the numbness her new medication has caused ("I Miss the Mountains"). At Gabe's suggestion, she flushes her medications.

Meanwhile, Dan arranges a family dinner, inviting Henry to join them ("It's Gonna Be Good"). When Diana brings to the table a cake for Gabe's birthday, Dan gently reminds her that Gabe, in fact, died nearly sixteen years ago, and her visions of him throughout the show have only been hallucinations ("He's Not Here"). After an upset Natalie runs to her bedroom, Dan clears off the dinner table while Diana reveals she has stopped her medication. As he tries to empathize with her, she becomes angry, saying he could not possibly understand the pain she is going through ("You Don't Know"). Dan begs her to let him help however he can, reminding her of his faithfulness and patience thus far, but is interrupted by a vision of Gabe, whom only Diana can see. Diana immediately clings to her son, rejecting Dan's offer of comfort ("I Am the One"). Upstairs, Natalie vents to Henry over her mother's attachment to the dead Gabe. Diana overhears their conversation and offers the only comfort she is capable of giving, telling Natalie, "I love you as much as I can" ("Superboy and the Invisible Girl").

Diana visits a new doctor, who performs talk therapy and hypnosis on her. During their session, she sees Gabe, who asserts his dominance over her and the control he has in her life ("I'm Alive"). Diana reveals intimate details about the effects of her illness, saying that she was unable to hold Natalie in the hospital when she was born. Meanwhile, Natalie botches an important piano recital upon discovering her parents are not in the audience ("Make Up Your Mind/ Catch Me I'm Falling"). Diana's doctor encourages her to go home, spend time with Natalie, and clean out a box of Gabe's old things in an attempt to let him go. Diana agrees but is confronted with a hallucination of Gabe while sorting through a box in their basement ("I Dreamed a Dance"). Gabe convinces her to commit suicide, saying it is the only way they can be together ("There's a World").

Diana is hospitalized after her suicide attempt fails, and Dr. Madden tells Dan that electroconvulsive therapy is one of the only options they have left. Dan returns home to clean up the scene of his wife's attempt at suicide, narrowly avoiding a breakdown of his own as he reminisces about the years spent with Diana (“I’ve Been”). Natalie finds him and is angry to discover that he has agreed to the doctor's recommendation of shock therapy. Upon returning to the hospital, he finds that Diana has become aggressive with the staff for wanting her to sign the confirmation papers, likening the idea of shock therapy to its depiction in the film One Flew Over the Cuckoo's Nest ("Didn't I See This Movie?"). However, after clearing the room, he manages to convince her of the necessity of this treatment, saying it is the only way they can get back to normal ("A Light in the Dark"). Diana reluctantly agrees and signs the papers.

Act II
Diana receives a series of ECT treatments over two weeks. Meanwhile, Natalie experiments with drugs and frequently goes clubbing, being rescued most nights by Henry, who sees her home safely. On one occasion, she seems to share a hallucination with her mother, highlighting some of the parallels between their emotional states ("Wish I Were Here"). Upon Diana's return home from the hospital, it is revealed that she has lost her memories of the last nineteen years due to the shock therapy – including the memory of her deceased son ("Song of Forgetting"). During this song Natalie expresses concerns over the efficacy of this "cure" claiming her mind is "so pure she doesn't know anything" while Dan remains hopeful about the eventual return of Diana's memory.  Henry, who has been finding Natalie passed out at clubs and driving her home, asks Natalie to the upcoming school dance, an invitation which she immediately declines ("Hey #1"). Meanwhile, Dan questions Dr. Madden over Diana's memory loss, learning it is a relatively common side effect of ECT ("Seconds and Years"). Because Gabe's death was the start of a lifetime of depression, Dan hesitates to remind her of it. At home, he and Natalie help Diana sort through a box of pictures and memories of her old life, leaving out any mention of Gabe's existence ("Better Than Before"). However, Diana is briefly confronted afterward by Gabe, who hints that she has forgotten a vital part of her life ("Aftershocks"). Meanwhile, Henry again invites Natalie to the dance but is turned down again ("Hey #2").

Diana visits Dr. Madden, who accidentally reveals the existence of her son, unaware that Dan has not yet done so ("You Don't Know (reprise)"). After learning this, Diana returns home and searches through Gabe's old belongings, finding the music box that helped him sleep as an infant.  When Dan finds her revisiting the night their son died, he reluctantly reminds her that their son had died of an illness all of the doctors missed ("How Could I Ever Forget?"). Diana confusedly admits she recalls hallucinating Gabe as a teenager, and Dan frantically says they will get her to the doctor and do more ECT ("It's Gonna Be Good (reprise)"), which leads to a heated argument between the two that Natalie witnesses the peak of. After Natalie runs upstairs to her bedroom, where Henry is waiting to talk with her, Diana questions Dan about why he stays, despite all of the things she puts him through and all the pain they have experienced together. He reminds her of their wedding vows and promises to see their relationship through, no matter how much she pushes him away. Upstairs, Henry makes a similar pledge to Natalie ("Why Stay?/A Promise"). However, Diana again sees Gabe and is immediately entranced by him, drawn away from Dan ("I'm Alive – Reprise").

Though Dan begs her to stay, Diana leaves and visits Dr. Madden, frustrated that years of treatment haven't seemed to improve her condition, and wonders if her grief over losing her son should truly be medicated ("The Break"). Dr. Madden pleads with her to stay with him, recommending more shock treatment and other medications, but she leaves the appointment ("Make Up Your Mind/Catch Me I'm Falling (reprise)"). Upon returning outside, she connects with Natalie for the first time, noting the similarities between the two of them and truly making an effort to connect with her for possibly the first time. They embrace and agree that somehow they will get a life somewhere next to normal, and Diana drives Natalie to the dance to meet Henry ("Maybe"). At the dance, Natalie voices her concerns to Henry that she will someday end up with the same issues as her mother, though Henry promises to stand by her no matter what, and the two kiss ("Hey #3/ Perfect For You (reprise)").

Diana returns home and tells Dan she is leaving him, saying that though she still loves him, they both must finally come to terms with their grief on their own ("So Anyway"). Devastated, Dan looks back on his years of faithfulness to her and sees Gabe for the first time ("I Am the One (reprise)"). The two share an embrace, and Dan says Gabe's name for the first and only time in the show. Gabe disappears, and Natalie returns home to find that her mother is gone. She continues her relationship with Henry, and Diana has moved in with her parents temporarily, still depressed but more hopeful than she's ever been. Dan visits Dr. Madden, who gives him the name of another psychiatrist he can talk to. Gabe is seen by the audience one final time, this time relaying a message of hope as opposed to the threatening, ominous persona he has previously taken, and the family adjusts to their new way of life ("Light").

Characters
Note: These descriptions come from the Characters section in the script. 
 Diana: "A suburban mother. Sharp. Delusional bipolar depressive. Thirties or forties."
 Gabe: "Diana's son who died as a baby. He comes back to her in visions as a teenager."
 Dan: "Diana's husband. Handsome. Genuine. Constant. Tired. Thirties or forties."
 Natalie: "Diana's daughter. Sixteen and trying to be perfect. It's not going well."
 Henry: "Musician. Romantic. Stoner. Slacker. Philosopher king. Seventeen."
 Doctor Madden: "On the young side of ageless. Assured. A rock star."
 Doctor Fine:  A Psychopharmacologist.

Musical numbers
Note: The song titles are not listed in the program

2008 Off-Broadway

 Act I
 "Prelude" – Orchestra
 "Preprise – Let There Be Light" – Dan, Natalie, Diana
 "Just Another Day" – Diana, Natalie, Gabe, Dan
 "Everything Else" – Natalie
 "More... And More... And More" – Diana, Natalie, Gabe, Henry, Doctor Madden
 "The Cavalry" – Dan
 "Who's Crazy"/ " My Psychopharmacologist and I" – Dan, Doctor Fine, Diana
 "Perfect For You" – Henry, Natalie
 "I Miss the Mountains" – Diana
 "It's Gonna Be Good" – Dan, Natalie, Henry, Diana
 "He's Not Here" – Dan
 "You Don't Know" – Diana
 "I Am the One" – Dan, Gabe, Diana
 "Superboy and the Invisible Girl" – Natalie, Diana, Gabe
 "Open Your Eyes" – Doctor Madden
 "I'm Alive" – Gabe
 "Make Up Your Mind"/ "Catch Me I'm Falling" – Doctor Madden, Diana, Dan, Natalie, Gabe, Henry
 "A Good Step" – Orchestra
 "I Dreamed a Dance" – Diana, Gabe
 "There's a World" – Gabe
 "In the Light" – Dan
 "E.C.T." – Orchestra
 "I've Been" – Dan, Gabe
 "Didn't I See This Movie?" – Diana
 "A Light in the Dark" – Dan, Diana
 "Feeling Electric" – Diana, Gabe, Dan, Doctor Madden, Natalie, Henry

 Act II
 "Growing Up Unstable" – Natalie
 "Song of Forgetting" – Dan, Diana, Natalie
 "Hey #1" – Henry, Natalie
 "Seconds and Years" – Doctor Madden, Dan, Diana
 "Getting Better" – Doctor Madden, Diana, Natalie
 "Better Than Before" – Doctor Madden, Dan, Natalie, Diana
 "Aftershocks" – Gabe
 "Hey #2" – Henry, Natalie
 "You Don't Know" (Reprise) – Diana, Doctor Madden
 "Music Box" – Gabe
 "How Could I Ever Forget?" – Diana, Dan
 "It's Gonna Be Good" (Reprise) – Dan, Diana
 "Why Stay?"/ "A Promise" – Diana, Natalie, Dan, Henry
 "I'm Alive" (Reprise) – Gabe
 "The Break" – Diana
 "Make Up Your Mind"/ "Catch Me I'm Falling" (Reprise) – Doctor Madden, Diana, Gabe
 "Everything" – Diana, Natalie
 "Hey #3”/ "Perfect For You" (Reprise) – Henry, Natalie
 "So Anyway" – Diana
 "I Am the One" (Reprise) – Dan, Gabe
 "Finale (Let There Be Light)" – Diana, Dan, Natalie, Gabe, Henry, Doctor Madden

2009 Broadway

 Act I
 "Prelude" – Orchestra
 "Just Another Day" – Diana, Natalie, Gabe, Dan
 "Everything Else" – Natalie
 "Who's Crazy" / "My Psychopharmacologist and I" – Dan, Doctor Fine, Diana
 "Perfect for You" – Henry, Natalie
 "I Miss the Mountains" – Diana
 "It's Gonna Be Good" – Dan, Natalie, Henry, Diana
 "He's Not Here" – Dan
 "You Don't Know" – Diana
 "I Am the One" – Dan, Gabe, Diana
 "Superboy and the Invisible Girl" – Natalie, Diana, Gabe
 "I'm Alive" – Gabe
 "Make Up Your Mind" / "Catch Me I'm Falling" – Doctor Madden, Diana, Dan, Natalie, Gabe, Henry
 "I Dreamed a Dance" – Diana, Gabe
 "There's a World" – Gabe
 "I've Been" – Dan, Gabe
 "Didn't I See This Movie?" – Diana
 "A Light in the Dark" – Dan, Diana

 Act II
 "Wish I Were Here" – Diana, Natalie
 "Song of Forgetting" – Dan, Diana, Natalie
 "Hey #1" – Henry, Natalie
 "Seconds and Years" – Doctor Madden, Dan, Diana
 "Better Than Before" – Doctor Madden, Dan, Natalie, Diana
 "Aftershocks" – Gabe
 "Hey #2" – Henry, Natalie
 "You Don't Know" (Reprise) – Diana, Doctor Madden
 "How Could I Ever Forget?" – Diana, Dan
 "It's Gonna Be Good" (Reprise) – Dan, Diana
 "Why Stay?" / "A Promise" – Diana, Natalie, Dan, Henry
 "I'm Alive" (Reprise) – Gabe
 "The Break" – Diana
 "Make Up Your Mind" / "Catch Me I'm Falling" (Reprise) – Doctor Madden, Diana, Gabe
 "Maybe (Next to Normal)" – Diana, Natalie
 "Hey #3" / "Perfect for You" (Reprise) – Henry, Natalie
 "So Anyway" – Diana
 "I Am the One" (Reprise) – Dan, Gabe
 "Light" – Diana, Dan, Natalie, Gabe, Henry, Doctor Madden

Depiction of mental illness

Bipolar disorder

Next to Normal follows the struggle of one woman, Diana Goodman, with mental illness and the effect of the illness on her whole family. In the second act, these effects are at times diminished and other times exacerbated by the fact that Diana additionally suffers memory loss following electroconvulsive therapy (ECT). Kitt and Yorkey began writing the musical in 2002 and continued through 2008, but there have since been changes in the understanding and treatment of bipolar depressive disorder. In the show, Diana's doctor describes her as a "bipolar depressive with delusional episodes", however, the most recent edition of the American Psychiatric Association's Diagnostic and Statistical Manual of Mental Disorders (DSM) would now diagnose Diana as bipolar "with psychotic features", referring to the hallucinations she experiences, such as of her dead son Gabe in the form of a teenager. The disorder is also now separated into bipolar types I and II.

Treatment

Bipolar disorder is a disorder of both mania (or hypomania) and depression that is not curable, mostly treated through psychopharmacological, psychotherapeutic, and biological means. First, are the psychopharmacological therapies, commonly known as drug therapies, which involves the use of antipsychotic, anticonvulsant, and antidepressant medications, that aim to stabilize the patient's mood. Such drugs include Lithium, a mood stabilizer, Ativan and Valium, benzodiazepines, all of which are mentioned in the lyrics, particularly in the song "My Psychopharmacologist and I", in which Diana is prescribed a plethora of different drugs at once, which are mentioned alongside their side-effects, ranging from drowsiness to sexual dysfunction. Another form of treatment the play explores is psychotherapy, where patients talk to psychologists or other licensed mental health professionals and aim to work through the psychological component of their disease through conversation; Diana's psychiatrist leads her through a guided meditation or hypnotherapeutic approach. The third form addressed is electroconvulsive therapy (ECT) in which seizures are induced by sending an electric current through the brain. Following a suicide attempt, Diana is convinced to undergo ECT and then loses her memory (including her memory of Gabe), which she slowly gains back in talks with her family. ECT is often viewed as a last-resort option for depressed patients who are incredibly ill and extremely treatment-resistant or whose symptoms include very serious suicidal or psychotic symptoms, or for pregnant women. This practice holds true in the play, in which ECT is only recommended after Diana's hallucination of Gabe suggests that she kill herself in the song "There's a World".

Productions

Development
The musical began in 1998 as a 10-minute workshop sketch about a woman undergoing electroshock therapy, and its impact on her family, called Feeling Electric.  Yorkey brought the idea to Kitt while both were at the BMI Lehman Engel Musical Theatre Workshop.  Kitt wrote a rock score for the short piece, which was highly critical of the medical treatment.  Both Yorkey and Kitt turned to other projects, but they "kept returning to Feeling Electric", eventually expanding it to a full-length musical.  This had a reading in 2002 at Village Theatre in Issaquah, Washington, then at several venues in New York City, with a cast that included Norbert Leo Butz as Dan, Sherie Rene Scott as Diana, Benjamin Schrader as Gabe, Anya Singleton as Natalie and Greg Naughton as Dr. Madden. A subsequent staged reading was held in late 2002 at the Musical Mondays Theater Lab in New York.

In 2005 it was workshopped again at Village Theatre starring Amy Spanger as Diana, Jason Collins as Dan, Mary Faber as Natalie and Deven May as Dr. Madden.  In September 2005, the musical ran at the New York Musical Theatre Festival, with Spanger as Diana, Joe Cassidy as Dan, Annaleigh Ashford as Natalie, Benjamin Schrader as Gabe and Anthony Rapp as Dr. Madden. This attracted the attention of producer David Stone. Second Stage Theatre then workshopped the piece in both 2006 and 2007, featuring Cassidy and then Gregg Edelman as Dan, Alice Ripley as Diana, Mary Faber and then Phoebe Strole as Natalie, Rapp as Dr. Madden/Dr. Fine and Skylar Astin as Henry. Meanwhile, at the urging of Stone and director Michael Greif, who had joined the team, the creators focused the show on the family's pain rather than on the critique of the medical establishment.

Off-Broadway and Virginia (2008–09)
Next to Normal was first produced Off-Broadway at the Second Stage Theatre from January 16 through March 16, 2008, directed by Greif, with Anthony Rapp as assistant director and musical staging by Sergio Trujillo. The cast featured Ripley as Diana, Brian d'Arcy James as Dan, Aaron Tveit as Gabe, Jennifer Damiano as Natalie, Adam Chanler-Berat as Henry and Asa Somers as Dr. Madden/Dr. Fine. The surname of the family was changed from Brown to Goodman.  Although the show received mixed reviews, at least one reviewer criticized it for pushing an irresponsible message about the treatment of bipolar disorder and for failing to strike the proper balance between pathos and comedy. The critics found the show internally confused, and the team decided to make major changes in both the book and score, including eliminating the original title song, "Feeling Electric".  They concentrated the story entirely on the emotions of Diana and her family as they confront bitter truths.

The re-written musical was given a regional theatre production at the Arena Stage (normally in Washington, D.C. but operating in Virginia during a renovation of its main facility), from November 21, 2008, through January 18, 2009, under the direction of Greif. J. Robert Spencer took over the role of Dan while Louis Hobson assumed the roles of Dr. Madden/Dr. Fine; the remaining Off-Broadway leads returned. The production received rave reviews, with critics noticing that "comic songs and glitzy production numbers" had been replaced by songs that complemented the emotional content of the book.

Broadway (2009–11)
Next to Normal began previews on Broadway at the Booth Theatre on March 27, 2009, with an opening night of April 15. The entire cast from the Arena Stage production returned, once again under the direction of Greif.  The musical was originally booked for the larger Longacre Theatre, but, according to producer David Stone, "When the Booth Theatre became available... we knew it was the right space for Next to Normal".

Reviews were very favorable. Ben Brantley of The New York Times wrote that the Broadway production is "A brave, breathtaking musical. It is something much more than a feel-good musical: it is a feel-everything musical."
Rolling Stone called it "The best new musical of the season – by a mile." Next to Normal was on the Ten Best of the Year list for 2009 of "Curtain Up".

The show set a new box office record at the Booth Theatre for the week ending January 3, 2010, grossing $550,409 over nine performances. The previous record was held by the 2006 production of Brian Friel's Faith Healer, with a gross of $530,702. One year later, Next to Normal broke that record again during its final week on Broadway (week ending January 16, 2011) grossing $552,563 over eight performances. The producers recouped their initial investment of $4 million a few days after the production's one-year anniversary on Broadway. At the end of its run, Next to Normal grossed $31,764,486, the most out of all the shows that have run at the Booth Theatre, earning double the amount of money as its closest competition, I'm Not Rappaport.

Cast replacements during the run included Marin Mazzie as Diana, Brian d'Arcy James and later Jason Danieley as Dan, Kyle Dean Massey as Gabe and Meghann Fahy as Natalie. John Kenrick wrote in November 2010 that the show "is glowing with breathtaking brilliance as it ends its Broadway run."

The Broadway production closed on January 16, 2011, after 21 previews and 733 regular performances.

Twitter promotional campaign 
In May 2009, about six weeks into the Broadway run, Next to Normal began publishing an adapted version of the script over Twitter, the social media network. Over 35 days, the serialized version of the show was published, a single line from a character at a time. The Twitter promotion ended the morning of June 7, 2009, the morning of the 63rd Tony Awards. The initiative earned the musical the 2009 OMMA Award for Best in Show.

First US tour (2010–11)
Next to Normal began its first national tour of North America and Canada at the Ahmanson Theatre in Los Angeles, California on November 23, 2010. The tour played in 16 cities in the U.S., ending in Toronto, Ontario, Canada on July 30, 2011. Alice Ripley reprised her role as Diana and was joined by Asa Somers as Dan, Emma Hunton as Natalie, Curt Hansen as Gabe, Preston Sadleir as Henry and Jeremy Kushnier as Dr. Madden/Dr. Fine.

East West Players (2017) 
East West Players (EWP) produced a diverse and inclusive version of the musical featuring a cast with nearly all artists of color as a part of their 51st season under the direction of Nancy Keystone. The production was originally slated to run from May 12 to June 11, 2018, but was extended a week through June 28 due to high demand. The show's popularity carried into awards season, earning the production four of the major awards at the 2018 Ovation Awards including Best Production of a Musical (Large Theater), Best Featured Actress in a Musical, Best Lead Actress in a Musical, and Direction in a Musical; additionally, the Set/Projection Designer for the show, Hana Kim, was honored with the Sherwood Award which seeks "to nurture innovative and adventurous theatre artists working in Los Angeles." Deedee Magno Hall played the leading role of Diana alongside her real-life husband Cliffton Hall, who played Diana's husband, Dan. Isa Briones won for her portrayal of Natalie.

The show was praised for its subject matter and the way in which the musical's exploration of mental health tied in seamlessly with its all-Asian cast. Mental health awareness is particularly stigmatized within areas of the Asian Pacific-Islander community as a result of conflicting cultural and familial emphases. EWP's producing artistic director Snehal Desai made a point to belabor the importance of "shedding light on the stigma of mental illness in our communities," and that he hoped that the production could create "a space for that conversation."

TheaterWorks Hartford (2017) 
TheaterWorks Hartford (TWH) ran a production of the show under the direction of Rob Ruggiero. The show originally ran from March 24 through April 30 before extending through May 14 of the same year in light of its great success. The show starred Christiane Noll as Diana Goodman, alongside David Harris as Dan Goodman. The cast also included Maya Keleher, John Cardoza, J.D. Daw, and Nick Sacks. The production garnered 10 nominations for the 2017 Connecticut Critic Circle Choice Awards, and won the awards for Outstanding Production of a Musical, Outstanding Actress in a Musical (Noll), Outstanding Director of a Musical, Outstanding Lighting, and Outstanding Debut (Keleher).

Joseph Harrison of BroadwayWorld wrote that the production "goes beyond entertainment, reaching in and touching you to your very core in a brilliant symphony of emotional energy." The Hartford Courant praised the show for "being done with such careful thought and expressive detail in such an intimate environment raises this already confrontational musical to a different level of emotional intensity" and praised Noll for being "a fearless performer [who] can switch from indomitability to vulnerability in a split second."

Kennedy Center (2020) 
Rachel Bay Jones, Brandon Victor Dixon, Roman Banks, Maia Reficco, Khamary Rose, Ben Levi Ross and Michael Park, joined original Broadway director Michael Greif for the Broadway Center Stage production at the John F. Kennedy Center for the Performing Arts in Washington, D.C. from January 29-February 3, 2020.

London (2023) 
In October 2022 it was announced that the show would receive its London premiere at the Donmar Warehouse, in a new production directed by Michael Longhurst. The production will run from 12th of August until the 7th of October 2023, over 15 years after it first premiered in New York. In January 2023, it was announced that Caissie Levy will play the lead role of Diana Goodman.

International
Note: The following are independent productions of the musical produced internationally and in most cases, in that native language. They also feature the original music, lyrics and book, but changes in other aspects including direction, set design, costume design and choreography.

 Nordic countries 
The European premiere and the first non-English language production opened in September 2010 at the Det Norske Teatret in Oslo, Norway under the direction of Svein Sturla Hungnes. The cast included Heidi Gjermundsen Broch as Diana and Charlotte Frogner as Natalie Broch received the 2011 Hedda Award (Norway's highest theatrical accolade) for her portrayal. This production was later re-staged for a Swedish premiere at the Wermland Opera A Finnish production opened in December 2010 in Helsinki, Finland at Studio Pasila, where it ran for one year. A Swedish-language production opened in September 2012 at Wasa Teater in Vaasa, Finland. The cast included Anna-Maria Hallgarn as Diana. Another Finnish-language production was staged at the Tampere Workers' Theatre from October 2012 through February 2013. A Swedish-language production opened open at Swedish Theatre in Helsinki in November 2021 and ran until March 2022. A Danish production ran from February 2012 until April 2012 at Nørrebro Teater in Copenhagen, Denmark. The show premiered again in Sweden in 2022, after being postponed due to the COVID-19 pandemic, at Uppsala Stadsteater with Helen Sjöholm as Diana.

 Asia 
The Asian premiere was staged at the Carlos P. Romulo Auditorium, RCBC Plaza, Makati, Philippines in March 2011 and again in October 2011. The cast included Markki Stroem as Henry.

Soon after The Philippines premiere, the show premiered in South Korea on November 2011. Since then the show had four local productions, each in 2011, 2013, 2015, and 2022. Kolleen Park played Diana in the every production from 2011 to 2022.Next to Normal premiered in Singapore on September 5, 2013, at the Drama Centre Theatre. The cast included Sally Ann Triplett as Diana, Adrian Pang as Dan, and Nathan Hartono as Gabe. A Chinese production premiered in Beijing, China, on August 3, 2018, and later played in Shanghai in December.

A Hong Kong production premiered on December 2, 2022.

 Australia 
The Australian premiere of the musical by the Melbourne Theatre Company was staged in Melbourne, Australia. Performances began on April 28, 2012, and ran through June 4 (extended from May 28). The cast included Kate Kendall as Diana, Matt Hetherington as Dan and Bert LaBonte as Dr. Fine/Dr. Madden.

A production in Perth played at the Heath Ledger Theatre from November 5–19, 2015. Produced by Black Swan State Theatre Company, the cast included Rachael Beck as Diana and Brendan Hanson as Dan.

Australia's first Musical Theatre performance since the start of the COVID-19 pandemic is a new production of Next to Normal directed by Darren Yap and choreographed by Kelley Abbey. The performance will run in October and November at the National Institute of Dramatic Art in Sydney.

The most recent production was scheduled to be performed at Chapel Off Chapel in Melbourne from the 15th of July 2021. The cast included Queenie van de Zandt as Diana, Tyran Parke as Dan, Melanie Bird as Natalie, Sam Richardson as Gabe, Liam Wigney as Henry and Ross Chisari as Dr. Madden/Dr. Fine. The show was presented by the James Terry Collective. Due to the snap COVID-19 pandemic lockdown, they were only able to perform one show at that time, resuming nearly eight months later in March 2022 with Hanlon Innocent alternating with Tomáš Kantor as Henry and Matt Hetherington reprising the role of Dan.

 America 
A Spanish-language Peruvian premiere of the musical played the Teatro Marsano, in Lima, Peru. The production ran from May to June 2011. The cast included Gisela Ponce de León as Natalie A Brazilian production opened in July 2012 at the Clara Nunes Theatre in Rio de Janeiro, under the title Quase Normal.

A Mexican production opened at the Teatro Aldama in Mexico City on January 31, 2019, starring Susana Zabaleta as Diana. The Mexican cast also included Federico Di Lorenzo as Dan, María Penella as Natalie, Mariano Palacios as Gabe, Jerry Velázquez as Henry/Gabe and Héctor Berzunza as Dr. Fine/Dr. Madden. The cast was also joined by María Chacón as Natalie, and Rodolfo Zarco as Henry for some performances. Directed by Diego Del Río, the creative team included Jorge Ballina (set design), Victor Zapatero (lighting design), Josefina Echeverría (costume design) and Alejandro García (sound design). This production was nominated for six awards in several categories at the Premios Metropolitanos de Teatro in 2019, which included Best Musical, Best Direction of a Musical, among others. Diego del Río, Susana Zabaleta, María Penella and Jerry Velázquez each won at their categories. After a short run in Mexico City, the musical had a single tour performance at Auditorio Luis Elizondo, in Monterrey on July 4, 2019. The original cast reunited on June 9, 2020, for an online live concert, where they read and sang through the score in an acoustic version of the musical.

Europe
The Dutch premiere took place on January 16, 2012, at DeLaMar Theater in Amsterdam. The cast included Simone Kleinsma as Diana. A German-language production translated and directed by Titus Hoffmann opened at the Stadttheater in Fürth, Bavaria, on October 11, 2013. Pia Douwes starred in the role of Diana with Thomas Borchert as Dan and Sabrina Weckerlin as Natalie. The Italian version, produced by STM and directed by Marco Iacomelli, opened on March 7, 2015, at Teatro Coccia in Novara. A Spanish-language production opened at the Teatro Pérez Galdós in Las Palmas, Canary Islands, on September 14, 2017, starring Nina as Diana, and then it toured through Spain with stops at Barcelona, Bilbao, and Madrid. In 2016, in Portugal, opened a Portuguese-speaking version, with the title Quase Normal. A Russian-language production (Недалеко от Нормы), directed by Anastasia Grinenko, opened in Minsk, Belarus on March 28, 2018, with Svetlana Matsievskaia starring as Diana. In Poland the show opened on April 6, 2019, at Teatr Syrena in Warsaw, with Katarzyna Walczak as Diana. The production was translated and directed by Jacek Mikołajczyk. The musical will have its UK premiere at the Donmar Warehouse, London from 12 August to 7 October 2023, directed by Michael Longhurst.

CastsNote: Below are the principal casts of all official major productions of the musical.Notable Broadway replacements
Gabriel "Gabe" Goodman: Kyle Dean Massey
Dan Goodman: Brian d'Arcy James, Jason Danieley 
Diana Goodman: Marin Mazzie
Natalie Goodman: Meghann Fahy

Literary references and allusions
During Act I, Gabe reads a paperback copy of The Catcher in the Rye. Kyle Dean Massey said, "I read about a page a night." Salinger's novel about grieving a loss is read by the character who is the loss.  In Catcher, Holden struggles with the loss of a brother, Allie, who died of leukemia.
When sorting through a box of items from her son's room, Diana picks up a music box from the box to reveal a copy of Goodnight Moon underneath.
Natalie carries a hardcover copy of Flowers for Algernon, which she is studying in school. Both the novel and Next to Normal deal with psychological experimentation.
Diana alludes to One Flew Over the Cuckoo's Nest, Sylvia Plath, and Frances Farmer in the song "Didn't I See This Movie?". This is in regards to her ECT that also takes place in the movie as a form of abuse, provoking questions as to whether Diana is a reliable narrator or whether the ECT is ethical. 
Diana also reads from Who's Afraid of Virginia Woolf?, a play by Edward Albee which deals with marital stress caused by issues similar to some in Next to Normal. On her YouTube site, Alice Ripley said that she uses Albee's play as a Bible, drawing inspiration for Diana.

Pulitzer Prize controversyNext to Normal won the 2010 Pulitzer Prize for Drama although it was not on the shortlist of three candidates submitted to the twenty-member Pulitzer Prize board by the five-member Drama jury. Jury chairman and critic Charles McNulty publicly criticized the Board for overlooking three plays (Bengal Tiger at the Baghdad Zoo, The Elaborate Entrance of Chad Deity, andIn the Next Room (or The Vibrator Play)), which were not running on Broadway at the time of the Award, in favor of one that was.

Major awards and nominations

Original Off-Broadway production

Original Virginia production

Original Broadway production

Legacy
In 2021, the songs of the musical were the focus of "Chapter Ninety-Four: Next to Normal", a musical episode of Riverdale. The Riverdale cast album of the musical was produced via WaterTower Music.

References

External links
Official Website

 Next to Normal'' at the Music Theatre International website
Twitter Performance Transcript
Lortel Archives listing
Interview with Brian Yorkey on MyNorthwest.com
NY Times Feature: An Out-of-Town Overhaul Helps Next to Normal Find Focus
NY Times Feature: On Broadway, 'Next to Normal' Aims for Truth About Mental Illness
Daily News Broadway review 2009
Entertainment Weekly Broadway review 2009
Associated Press Broadway review 2009
Washington Post Broadway Review 2009
NY Times off-Broadway review, February 2008
TheatreMania review, February 2008

Musik und Bühne Verlag German licensing company
Argentina Website
Italian Website
https://de.wikipedia.org/wiki/Next to Normal

Off-Broadway musicals
Original musicals
Bipolar disorder in fiction
Mental health in fiction
Fiction about suicide
Works about depression
Sung-through musicals
American rock musicals
Broadway musicals
2008 musicals
Musicals by Brian Yorkey
Musicals by Tom Kitt (musician)
Pulitzer Prize for Drama-winning works
Pulitzer Prize for Drama-winning musicals
Plays set in the 21st century
Tony Award-winning musicals